The American Samoa national handball team is the national men's handball team of American Samoa. Controlled by the American Samoa Handball Association it represents American Samoa in international matches.

In 2019 the team came 4th in the Oceania Championships.

Oceania Nations Cup record

Competitive record at the Oceania Nations Cup

References

External links
America Samoa on IHF web page
Oceania Continent Handball Federation webpage

Men's national handball teams
National sports teams of American Samoa